Jose Thettayil (born 17 August 1950) is an Indian politician, trade unionist, advocate, and a member of Janata Dal (Secular). He was the ex- minister for Transport in the Government of Kerala. He represents the Angamaly constituency in Ernakulam district in the Kerala Legislative Assembly.

Career
Jose was born in Angamaly on 17 August 1950 as the son of Thomas Thettayil and Philomina. He received his BSc degree in Zoology from Sree Sankara College, Kalady and Bachelor of Laws (LL.B.) degree from Government Law College, Ernakulam. He entered Politics through Kerala Students Union (KSU), the student wing of the Indian National Congress. He was convener of the Youth Congress, Ankamaly Constituency in 1973. Jose was expelled from Indian National Congress in 1975, during the Emergency period. Jose joined the erstwhile Janata Party in 1977 and became a State Committee Member and National Council Member in 1980 and Janata Party Vice-President of Ernakulam district in 1981.

Personal life
Jose is married to Daisy. The couple has two sons Jose and Adarsh. Adarsh is married to Jyothis.

As an advocate he was active and notable, as he has served under many designations such as, public prosecutor to the supreme court, public prosecutor to the state, public prosecutor for the state banking sectors, notably has advocated for KSRTC for more than 10 years, and many public sector departments for the state.

As a public servant
He was elected to the legislative assembly from Angamaly constituency for two tenure period (2006–11) (2011–2016).This period of public life was duly noted for his excellence and accusations.
He is credited with having a scrupulous and innovative political involvement in public administrations. Also he has credit in the locus for inducing and completing sumptuous projects for the constituency as a member of legislative assembly, he enjoys a locale lingo for completing number of projects than the chief ministers during his tenures.
He was able to badge the credit for bringing up the concept of multiplex theatres and malls in KSRTC bus stations for the first time in the country. As the minister for transport reforms and initiatives where ideal and in a faster pace even to warp bribery both from the ground level and reduced the powers for the ministers which were misused (but were reverted with newly elected govt interventions during 2012-13).

His notable works under ministry:

 Only minister in the cabinet who opposed state's appeal to NHIA for revision of national highway widening limit in Kerala from 60 metres to 30 metres, where even the opposition stood for 30 metres. NHIA suggested 60 metres for the state highway widening, but the political parties pulled threads to narrow the road's width to 30 metres. He faced pressures for his stand against this unethical 30 m proposal, and rather proposed for a 45-metre revision. In Kerala, land acquisitions:vote banks:politics:business have adverse relations.
 private sector transport service providers' caviling demands were given no support as before (major problem faced by public due to private service providers such as taxi, auto-rickshaw, bus operators)
 Introduced astonishing THIRU KOCHI services in the business capital city of Kerala
 the JNNRUM low floor a/c bus services were done with revenue study initiatives by NATPAC
 concept of multiplex theaters and malls in KSRTC bus stations for the first time in the country.
 Introduction of pension to the employees of state transport department for the first in country.
 The most anticipated grease the hand political interventions which caused a weft for the vytilla mobility hub for years was put to an end by initiating and functioning the first phase of the hub with a fast pace.
 number of projects and initiatives both locale and state wise .

Filmography
2011: Kanakompathu
2014: My Dear Mummy

Allegation
In June 2013, Jose and his son Adarsh were alleged by a lady resident of his constituency for having sexually abused her over the course of a year. She released edited versions of bedroom scenes featuring her with the MLA. It was later proved as a consensual encounter, and not a rape. Supreme Court of India rejected the sexual abuse petition on finding it as "politically motivated". The Bench, headed by Justice T S Thakur, noted that the woman had invited Thettayil to the flat and captured intimate moments on camera. Apparent candidate ruffle was observed later.

See also 
 Kerala Council of Ministers

References

External links

Malayali politicians
People from Angamaly
Living people
Janata Dal (Secular) politicians
1950 births
Trade unionists from Kerala
Kerala politicians
Indian National Congress politicians